I'm a Bluesman is an album by blues guitarist and singer Johnny Winter. This was his first studio album with new material in twelve years, released by Virgin Records on June 25, 2004.

The album is a mixture of original songs and covers of blues standards. As the album's title suggests, the songs have strong emphasis on traditional electric blues over the blues-rock elements on some previous Winter albums.

I'm a Bluesman was nominated for a Grammy Award for Best Contemporary Blues Album.

Critical reception

Music website AllMusic gave I'm a Bluesman three out of five stars. Reviewer Richie Unterberger stated that "... it was about exactly the set you'd expect from Winter, setting energetic if predictably formatted material to solid electric blues arrangements..." and
pointed out the acoustic song "That Wouldn't Satisfy" as providing the album's more inspired moments.

Track listing

(*) Bonus track for Japan edition.

Personnel

Musicians
 Johnny Winter - vocals, electric guitar, acoustic guitar, slide guitar
 Paul Nelson - rhythm guitar
 Scott Spray - bass
 Wayne June - drums
 James Montgomery - harmonica

Guest musicians
 Tom Hambridge - drums, percussion, backing vocals
 Mike Welch - rhythm guitar
 Brad Hallen - bass
 Reese Wynans - keyboards
 Tommy MacDonald - bass
 Sal Baglio - rhythm guitar

Production
 Produced by Tom Hambridge and Dick Shurman.
 Co-Produced by Johnny Winter.
 Recorded by Ducky Carlisle
 Mixed by David Axelbaum and Dick Shurman.
 A&R - David J. Wolter.
 Mastered by Greg Calbi
 CD Design by Kirk Richard Smith Creative Direction Sean Mosher Smith

References

Johnny Winter albums
2004 albums
Albums produced by Johnny Winter
Virgin Records albums